{{DISPLAYTITLE:C14H11N}}
The molecular formula C14H11N may refer to:

 Anthramine
 Dibenzazepine (iminostilbene)
 2-Methyl-6-(phenylethynyl)pyridine (MPEP)
 2-Phenylindole
 N-Vinylcarbazole

Molecular formulas